Jack Freeman may refer to:

Jack Freeman (Australian rules footballer) (1891–1916), Australian rules footballer
Jack Freeman (American football) (1918–2003), American college football head coach
Jack Freeman (American football, born 1922) (1922–1990), American football player for the Brooklyn Dodgers

See also
John Freeman (disambiguation)